The Indian Economic and Social History Review is an academic journal of Indian economic history. It is published by SAGE Publications. The founding editor-in-chief was Tapan Raychaudhuri,  who was succeeded by Dharma Kumar. The current editors-in-chief are Sunil Kumar and Sanjay Subrahmanyam. The journal is a member of the Committee on Publication Ethics (COPE).

Abstracting and indexing 
Indian Economic and Social History Review is abstracted and indexed in:
 EBSCO: EconLit
 ProQuest: International Bibliography of the Social Sciences (IBSS)
 Social Sciences Citation Index (Web of Science)
 SCOPUS
 Research Papers in Economics (RePEc)
 DeepDyve
 Portico
 Dutch-KB
 Pro-Quest-RSP
 EBSCO
 Ohio
 Sociological Abstracts - ProQuest
 Social Services Abstracts - ProQuest
 Worldwide Political Science Abstracts - ProQuest
 Bibliography of Asian Studies (BAS)
 J-Gate

References 

 COPE

External links 
 
 Homepage

Asian history journals
Economic history journals
SAGE Publishing academic journals
Publications established in 1964
Quarterly journals
English-language journals